Polen may refer to:

Places
 Poland in many European languages
 Names of Poland
 Polen, Iowa, an unincorporated community in Iowa, USA
 Poleň, Czech Republic
 Pollein, Aosta Valley, Italy
 Hotel Polen, Amsterdam, the Netherlands

People
 Bram van Polen (born 1985), Dutch footballer
 Bruce Polen (born 1951), American football coach
 Dennis Polen, Polen Special designer
 Doug Polen (born 1960), American motorcycle road racer
 Nat Polen (1914—1981), American actor
 Rietrik Polén (1823–1884), Finnish journalist and lecture
 Polen Uslupehlivan (born 1990), Turkish female volleyball player

Other uses
 Polen (album), a 2001 album by Lynda Thomas
 Polen Records, an independent music label based in Bogota, Colombia 
 Polen Special, a homebuilt racing aircraft

See also
 
 Pollen (disambiguation)
 Polonia (disambiguation)
 Polonaise (disambiguation)
 Pologne (disambiguation)

Surnames of Polish origin